Howard "Howie" Post (November 2, 1926 – May 21, 2010) was an American animator, cartoonist, and comic strip and  comic book writer-artist.

Post is known for his syndicated newspaper comic strip The Dropouts which had a 13-year run and for creating DC Comics' Anthro.

Early life and career
Born in New York City, Post grew up in the Coney Island and Sheepshead Bay neighborhoods of Brooklyn and then in The Bronx. In a 1999 interview, he recalled his start in drawing and his father's influence:

As a teenager, Post attended the Hastings School of Animation, in New York City. When he was age 16 or 17, his father was stricken with tuberculosis and hospitalized, making Post the primary breadwinner for a family of four. At Paramount Pictures' animation studio, Famous Studios he earned $24 a week as an in-betweener.

Comic books
To supplement what even then was considered a meager income, Post broke into comic books—first being rejected by the L.B. Cole studio on 42nd Street and then successfully selling work to artist Bernard Baily on West 43rd. Post's earliest confirmed comic book art appeared in 1945: the cover of publisher Prize Comics' Wonderland Comics #2, and the five-page "3-Alarm Fire!", starring Hopeless Henry, in Cambridge House Publishers' Gold Medal Comics #1. Credited as Howie Post, he soon began drawing for the company that would become DC Comics, including the features "Jimminy and the Magic Book" in More Fun Comics, "Rodeo Rick" in Western Comics, "Presto Pete" in Animal Antics, "Chick 'n Gumbo" in Funny Folks, and "J. Rufus Lion" in Comic Cavalcade, among other work. During the 1950s, he drew many humorous stories for the satirical comics Crazy, Wild, and Riot, from Marvel Comics' 1950s forerunner, Atlas Comics, as well as occasional stories in that publishers horror comics, including Journey into Mystery, Uncanny Tales, and Mystery Tales. As Howie Post, he drew the three-issue run of Atlas' The Monkey and the Bear (Sept. 1953 - Jan. 1954).

Harvey Comics and later career at Famous Studios
By 1961, Post was drawing adventures of such Harvey Comics’ characters as Hot Stuff the Little Devil, Spooky the Tuff Little Ghost, Wendy the Good Little Witch, and the Ghostly Trio in such comics books as Casper's Ghostland and TV Casper & Company, starring Casper the Friendly Ghost. Post was the head of Paramount Cartoon Studios, as well as a key director, succeeding Seymour Kneitel from 1964 through 1965.

He later went up to director and writer position at Famous Studios, and created and designed a character named Honey Halfwitch (voiced by Shari Lewis), who is half-wizard, half-girl. Post pitched the character to the highest brass at Paramount. In June 1966, Shamus Culhane, the last head of Famous Studios, took over the series, and the character was given a new design and voice in the last 4 cartoons. The final cartoon, Brother Bat, was the last cartoon with Post's involvement as a writer. The series would continue until August of 1967, 4 months before the studio shutted down.

Anthro
In the late 1960s, as Howie Post, he created, wrote and drew the prehistoric-teen comic book Anthro for DC Comics, which ran six issues (Aug. 1968 - Aug. 1969) after debuting in Showcase, with the last issue in the series inked by Wally Wood and Ralph Reese.

The Dropouts

The Dropouts was a comic strip created by Post and was syndicated by United Features Syndicate from 1968 to 1981. Post began the strip at the same time his comic book Anthro was canceled. The premise of The Dropouts was a variation on the "stranded on a desert island" gag. The two main characters, Alf and Sandy, were indeed castaways, but the island is hardly deserted: One of the strip's running gags was how closely the natives' society resembled Western civilization. Other characters, all natives, included a one-man police force, a doctor, and a chef running a cafe with inedible food. There were other Western characters, including a religious zealot, an angry feminist and a disheveled alcoholic, Chugalug.

Later life and career
In the mid-to-late 1980s, Post drew for the Star imprint of Marvel Comics, on titles such as Heathcliff and Care Bears. He was also an editor on Looney Tunes Magazine and Tiny Toons Magazine for DC Comics.

In later years, Post taught art and illustration privately and at New York's School of Visual Arts.

A long-time resident of Leonia, New Jersey, he was survived by his companion of 24 years, Pamela Rutt, and two daughters, Andee Post and Glynnis Doda. His wife Bobbee predeceased him in 1980.

References

External links

Post Scripts by Mark Evanier
 

1926 births
2010 deaths
American comic strip cartoonists
Artists from Brooklyn
People from Sheepshead Bay, Brooklyn
People from Crown Heights, Brooklyn
People from Leonia, New Jersey
Famous Studios people
Inkpot Award winners